Elias Saba is a Lebanese politician and economist. Born in Kfarhata, Lebanon in 1932.

Saba served as finance minister on two occasions; firstly, in the government of Saeb Salam, from 13 October 1970 to 27 May 1972; secondly in the government of Omar Karami, from 21 October 2004 to 18 April 2005. He also served as defense minister in Salam's government from October 1970 to June 1971.

Saba was among the politicians who joined former Prime Minister Omar Karami in creating the Rassemblement national in 2006.

References

1932 births
Living people
Defense ministers of Lebanon
Finance ministers of Lebanon
Government ministers of Lebanon
Members of the Parliament of Lebanon
Greek Orthodox Christians from Lebanon